Soleymani, Soleimani, Sulaymani, Suleimani, or Sulaimani may refer to:

People
Meysam Soleimani (born 1986), Iranian footballer
Leyla Soleymani, Canadian scientist
Sarah Solemani (born 1982), British actress and writer
Qasem Soleimani (1957–2020), Iranian general
Mohammad Soleimani (born 1954), Iranian politician
Haj Ghorban Soleimani (1920–2008), Iranian musician
Davoud Soleymani, Iranian politician
Qasem Soleimani Dashtaki, Iranian politician

Places
Soleymani, Sirjan, a village in Kerman Province
Sulaimani, Soleymani, Silêmanî, or Sulaymaniyah is a city in Iraqi Kurdistan
Soleymani, Kazerun, a village in Fars Province
Soleymani, Zarrin Dasht, a village in Fars Province
Soleymani, Firuzeh, a village in Razavi Khorasan Province, Iran
Soleymani, Mashhad, a village in Razavi Khorasan Province, Iran

Other
Slimani
Sulaymani, a branch of Tayyibi Isma'ilism
Süleymancılar, a Muslim Sunni-Hanafi jamia based in Turkey
Sulejmani, Albanian surname

See also 
Shahid Qasem Soleimani Stadium (disambiguation)
Qasem Soleimani Expressway
Funeral of Qasem Soleimani